The Reformist Democracy Party (Turkish: Islahatçı Demokrasi Partisi, abbreviated IDP) was a right-wing Nationalist political party in Turkey formed on 21 March 1984. In 1991 elections; IDP, Welfare Party and Nationalist Task Party formed an alliance called "Holy Alliance". As a result of a coalition of the three parties, the party was able to gain three seats in the parliament After 1991-1995 term the party failed to gain any seats in the parliament. It was renamed Nation Party on 23 November 1992. Its chairman was Aykut Edibali.

References 

Defunct nationalist parties in Turkey
1984 in Turkey